The Aging Symposium in Alberta, Canada is an academic conference on aging that was first held in 1982. From 1982 until 2002, the symposium was held every ten years, and from 2002 to present, it has been held every five years. Because there are several distinct gerontology research groups in Alberta, symposium sponsorship has alternated between different organizations. Since the first symposium in 1982, conferences have alternately been sponsored by the Alberta Centre on Aging, the Alberta Association of Gerontology, the Alberta Council on Aging, the University of Alberta's Special Interest Group on Aging, and Grey Matters Alberta.

History 
The Aging Symposium in Alberta has been held in cities such as Edmonton, Calgary, and Hinton. The impact the Aging Symposium has been documented in a range of subsequent literature. In particular, research that was presented at the 2007 Edmonton Aging Symposium has been cited in books by authors such as Greg Critser and Greg Fahy, as well as in articles published in the Journal of Nutrition, Health and Aging.

1982 
Alberta's first aging symposium was sponsored by the Canadian Association of Gerontology held in conjunction with the introduction of the University of Alberta's Centre for Gerontology, which was eventually renamed the Alberta Centre on Aging. In 1982, the University of Alberta introduced the Centre for Gerontology, which was sponsored by both the Faculty of Arts and the Faculty of Medicine; the centre was created "to enhance the understanding of the aged individual and of the aging process by mean of the support, encouragement, and facilitation of research in gerontology." The 1982 symposium was held May 31-June 3. The 1982 symposium took place at the Hotel Macdonald. The 1982 symposium was organized by Dr. Hayden Roberts.

1992 
Ten years after the first symposium, a second conference was held October 22-25, 1992. Similar to the first conference, the second aging symposium was co-sponsored by the Canadian Association of Gerontology and the University of Alberta's Centre for Gerontology.

2002 
In October 2002, a third Alberta aging symposium was sponsored by the Alberta Council on Aging and held in Calgary. This symposium was funded by several different groups including the University of Calgary and Athabasca University, as well as the Seniors Advisory Council for Alberta and the Canadian Institute on Health and Aging.

2007 
Following the increased interest and enthusiasm for gerontological research generated by the previous three symposia, the 2007 symposium marked a shift to a quinquennial cycle; by this time the University of Alberta's Centre for Gerontology had formally changed its name to the Alberta Centre on Aging and was the lead sponsor for the conference. Branded as the Edmonton Aging Symposium, the conference was held March 30-31, 2007. The 2007 symposium featured presentations from Aubrey de Grey, Gregory Stock, Ronald Bailey, Daniel Callahan, Luiji Fontana, Judith Campisi, William J. Evans, Ellen Heber-Katz, and Amit Patel, amongst others. The 2007 symposium took place at Bernard Snell Hall at the University of Alberta. The 2007 symposium was organized by Dr. Kevin Perrott.

2012 
Similar to the symposium presented five years prior in 2007, Alberta's fifth aging symposium was held on campus at the University of Alberta. Instead of being presented by the Alberta Centre on Aging, however, the fifth symposium was sponsored by the university's Special Interest Group on Aging in the Faculty of Rehabilitation Medicine. The fifth aging symposium was held in June 2012.

2017 
From September 11-13, 2017 a sixth aging symposium was held in Hinton, Alberta and sponsored by Grey Matters Alberta.

See also 
 Alberta Centre on Aging
List of Canadian provinces and territories by life expectancy

References

External links 
 Official website

Ageing
Academic conferences
Gerontology organizations
Medical conferences
Science conferences